The Best of John Coltrane is a 1970 compilation album released by Atlantic Records collecting recordings made by jazz saxophonist John Coltrane. The album was released shortly after his death as a part of the "Atlantic Jazz Anthology"—a series of greatest hits compilations for Atlantic jazz artists—and features performances from his brief period recording for Atlantic with new liner notes by jazz journalist Nat Hentoff.

Recording and reception

Three songs—"Cousin Mary", "Giant Steps", and "Naima"—come from his 1959 sessions for the album Giant Steps and represent the height of Coltrane's experimentation with Coltrane changes and sheets of sound. His cover version of "My Favorite Things" is a modal jazz interpretation of the standard Rodgers and Hammerstein composition from the album of the same name and was recorded in 1960 concurrent with the songs from 1964's Coltrane's Sound ("Central Park West" and "Equinox".) Although his recordings with Atlantic were a brief portion of his career, they represent a dramatic shift in his genre of jazz playing toward experimental free jazz as well as a change from tenor to soprano saxophone and the introduction of his classic quartet on the 1960 material. As this album only compiles his Atlantic material, it is not representative of his entire discography, the bulk of which was recorded for Impulse! Records. The album reached No. 20 on the Billboard Jazz Albums chart in February 1971.

In spite of the narrow scope of the compilation, it has received positive reviews. The Rolling Stone Jazz Record Guide gave the album five out of five stars and at AllMusic, the editorial staff gave it 4.5 out of five with reviewer Lindsay Planer writing that it is a "pithy yet effective compilation" that captures Coltrane "at his undisputed peak".

Track listing
All songs composed by John Coltrane and published by Jowcol, BMI, except "My Favorite Things", composed by Richard Rodgers and Oscar Hammerstein and published by Williamson ASCAP

Side one
"My Favorite Things" (from My Favorite Things, 1961) – 13:41
"Naima" (from Giant Steps, 1960) – 4:21
"Giant Steps" (from Giant Steps) – 4:43

Side two
"Equinox" (from Coltrane's Sound, 1964) – 8:33
"Cousin Mary" (from Giant Steps) – 5:45
"Central Park West" (from Coltrane's Sound) – 4:12

Personnel
Musicians on Giant Steps
John Coltrane – tenor saxophone, band leader
Paul Chambers – double bass
Jimmy Cobb – drums on "Naima"
Tommy Flanagan – piano on "Cousin Mary"
Wynton Kelly – piano on "Naima"
Art Taylor – drums on "Cousin Mary"

Musicians on Coltrane's Sound and My Favorite Things
John Coltrane – soprano saxophone on "My Favorite Things", tenor and soprano saxophone on "Central Park West" and "Equinox", band leader
Steve Davis – double bass
Elvin Jones – drums
McCoy Tyner – piano

Additional personnel
Tom Dowd – engineering
Nesuhi Ertegun – production
Loring Eutemey – cover design
Lee Friedlander – photography
Nat Hentoff – liner notes
Phil Iehle – engineering on Giant Steps
Stephen Innocenzi – mastering on Giant Steps

Release history

References

External links

The Best of John Coltrane at Rate Your Music

1970 greatest hits albums
Albums produced by Nesuhi Ertegun
Atlantic Records compilation albums
Hard bop compilation albums
Instrumental compilation albums
John Coltrane compilation albums
Modal jazz compilation albums
Compilation albums published posthumously